Such Friends Are Dangerous is the second and final studio album by American punk rock band Excuse 17, released on April 24, 1995 by Kill Rock Stars. The album received generally positive reviews from music critics.

Critical reception

Such Friends Are Dangerous received generally positive reviews. Jimmy Draper of AllMusic said that the album is "full of violently emotional catharsis", citing the songs "This Is Not Your Wedding Song" and "The Drop Dead Look" as the "startling centerpieces." Prominent music critic Robert Christgau gave the album a 1 star honorable mention, commenting "Carrie Brownstein finds her scream." J. Neo of Puncture praised the vocal interplay between Becca Albee and Brownstein, stating that "the way they trade lines and finish each other's songs is electrifying."

Track listing
 "5 Acres" – 2:03
 "Forever Fired" – 3:14
 "Watchmaker" – 3:08
 "I'd Rather Eat Glass" – 2:56
 "Deactur H.S." – 2:20
 "This Is Not Your Wedding Song" – 4:28
 "The Drop Dead Look" – 1:47
 "Designated Shotgun" – 2:28
 "Getoff" – 2:34
 "Nervousness Never Fades" – 2:27
 "Special Guest, Me" – 2:10
 "Framed" – 2:14
 "She Wants 3-D" – 2:29

Personnel
Becca Albee (vocals, guitar)
Carrie Brownstein (guitar, vocals) 
Curtis James (drums)

References

1995 albums
Kill Rock Stars albums
Excuse 17 albums